The Jinan West railway station is a high-speed railway station in Jinan, the capital of Shandong province, People's Republic of China.

Overview

It is served by the Beijing-Shanghai High Speed Railway and Shijiazhuang-Jinan High Speed Railway which mainly serve Beijing to Shanghai passengers, and was opened for high-speed rail service on 30 June 2011. New services to Ningbo, Fuzhou, Wuhan and Changsha were added on 1 July 2013. The West Railway station is located about 20 kilometers to the west of the city centre of Jinan.

CRH Trains from Beijing to Qingdao, Yantai and Rongcheng call at the central Jinan railway station instead, passing through Jinan West without stopping.

Some CRH trains from eastern Shandong province are diverted to terminate at this station and Jinan East railway station (Jinandong) in order to prevent the relatively small Jinan railway station from overloading during rush hours.

The design of the station accommodates a single entrance for departing passengers at the eastern side of the station. There are exits on the western and eastern sides of Jinan West for arriving passengers. At the departures level, part of the waiting concourse is designated as a VIP waiting area for Business Class passengers, and another portion dedicated for special needs passengers.

The station is on Line 1 of the Jinan Metro.

References

External links

Railway stations in Shandong
Railway stations in China opened in 2011
Transport in Jinan
Stations on the Qingdao–Taiyuan High-Speed Railway